This is a list of multivariable calculus topics. See also multivariable calculus, vector calculus, list of real analysis topics, list of calculus topics.

Closed and exact differential forms
Contact (mathematics)
Contour integral
Contour line
Critical point (mathematics)
Curl (mathematics)
Current (mathematics)
Curvature
Curvilinear coordinates
Del
Differential form
Differential operator
Directional derivative
Divergence
Divergence theorem
Double integral
Equipotential surface
Euler's theorem on homogeneous functions
Exterior derivative
Flux
Frenet–Serret formulas
Gauss's law
Gradient
Green's theorem
Green's identities
Harmonic function
Helmholtz decomposition
Hessian matrix
Hodge star operator
Inverse function theorem
Irrotational vector field
Isoperimetry
Jacobian matrix
Lagrange multiplier
Lamellar vector field
Laplacian
Laplacian vector field
Level set
Line integral
 Matrix calculus
Mixed derivatives
Monkey saddle
Multiple integral
Newtonian potential
Parametric equation
Parametric surface
Partial derivative
Partial differential equation
Potential
Real coordinate space
Saddle point
Scalar field
Solenoidal vector field
Stokes' theorem
Submersion
Surface integral
Symmetry of second derivatives
Taylor's theorem
Total derivative
Vector field
Vector operator
Vector potential

list
Mathematics-related lists
Outlines of mathematics and logic
Wikipedia outlines